Falcón State is one of the 23 states of Venezuela. The state capital is Coro.

The state was named after Juan Crisóstomo Falcón.

History

Early history 
Present day Falcón State was first explored in 1499 by Juan de la Cosa and Américo Vespucio, as part of an expedition supervised by Alonso de Ojeda. In 1527, the city of Coro was founded by Juan Ampíes, who named it "Santa Ana de Coro". 
In 1811, when Venezuela declared its independence from Spain, Coro remained faithful to the Spanish Crown and was merged with the Province of Maracaibo.  In 1815, King  Fernando VII created the Province of Coro. In 1821, the province was liberated from Spain by Josefa Camejo during the Venezuelan War of Independence  The area then became a province of the department of Zulia of the Republic of Gran Colombia.  In 1830, with the separation of Venezuela from Gran Colombia,  the Falcón area became a separate province of that nation.  

By 1856, the province contained the cantons of Coro, San Luis, Casigua, Costa Arriba, Cumarebo and the Paraguaná Peninsula. In 1859, after the Federal War began on February 20 in Coro, the area was declared the Independent State of Coro. In 1864, it became a federal state, part of the United States of Venezuela.

Falcón State 
In 1872 the province was renamed Falcón State, in honor of the Federal War leader Juan Crisóstomo Falcón. In 1879, along with Lara and Yaracuy, minus the Department of Nirgua, it became part of the Western Northern State. Between 1881 and 1890 is formed, with Zulia, the state of Falcón-Zulia.

In 1891 Falcón was reestablished as a separate state. In 1899 its name changed, and for a short period of time, it retook its historical denomination of Estado Coro; returning in 1901 to tFalcón .

In 1899, the territory comprising the towns of Tucacas and Chichiriviche, was annexed by Falcón.  Lara State received the municipality of Urdaneta.

Coro, the capital, founded with the name of Santa Ana de Coro, was declared National Monument in 1950, and UNESCO has named it Cultural Patrimony of the Humanity in 1993.

Geography
Falcón State is located in the north of the Corian System. To the south, Falcón contains medium-altitude mountain ranges configured from east to west, which in the eastern part of the state reach the Caribbean Sea, forming maritime valleys.

West from the city of Coro, a coastal plain runs parallel to the Gulf of Venezuela. To the north lies one of the most characteristic geographic features of the Venezuelan coast: the Paraguana Peninsula, linked to the mainland by the isthmus of Médanos de Coro National Park.

Climate
A hot arid climate (BWh according to the Köppen climate classification) of very low rainfall dominates the western coast and the Paraguaná Peninsula.

Soils
On the coastline the soils are calcareous, and between the Lara and Falcón mountains, they are clay. They vary in quality, but in general, the availability of land for traditional agriculture can be classified as low, with 89% of very low potential, 3% of low potential and 6% of moderate potential.

Only 2% of it is located in the southeast valleys and alluvial areas, basins with very high potential. The limitations of the arid and semi-arid soils come from salinity, dryness caused by low rainfall, low concentration of organic matter and the influence of climatic agents such as wind.

Relief
The Corian System of Falcon State presents a diversity of landscapes ranging from coastal plains on its Caribbean side to mountain ranges formed by valleys and hills, in an area of transition between the two major mountain systems of the country. The Sierra de San Luis have the highest altitude of the entire system, but are of very modest height; the highest does not exceed 1600 meters.

Cerro Santa Ana is another natural landmark, located in the center of the Paraguaná peninsula. Unlike the rest of the peninsula, the characteristics of Santa Ana Hill are the contrast between its greenness and the xerophytic vegetation of the Paraguaná area. It has three peaks: the Santa Ana (the highest, that ascends to about 830 meters above sea level), the Buena Vista and Moruy.

Hydrography

The state's hydrography is very poor. All the rivers flow north, either into the Caribbean Sea or the Gulf of Venezuela. However, the main Venezuelan river of the Caribbean basin, the Tocuyo, bathes a large area of the state before flowing into the Caribbean on the east coast of the state after travelling 423 km. Another river worth mentioning that flows into the Caribbean is Rio Aroa, with a length of 130 km. From the basin of the Gulf of Venezuela, the main ones are the Matícora (201 km) and the Mitare with 120 km.

Main rivers: Tocuyo, Aroa, Güigüe, Hueque, Matícora, Mitare, Pedregal, Remedios, Ricoa, San Luis.
Lakes: under the San Luis mountain range in the Cueva del Toro, there is an underground lake, the largest known in Venezuela, called "Río Acarite".

Flora and fauna
The marine flora is very rich. There is a great diversity of algae on the rocky shores and on the reef bottoms. The fishing potential of its waters is enormous and among the species that are extracted are shrimp, octopus, squid, mackerel, corocoro, mullet, horse mackerel, lebranche and dogfish.

Other species require protection such as sea turtles and the critically endangered Orinoco crocodile. The latter inhabits the coastal mangroves of Morrocoy, Cuare and the isthmus, along with the sea shearwater, herons, gannets and the flamingo. Among the invertebrates, the Hueque scorpion (Tityus falconensis) stands out, discovered in the caves of the Juan Crisóstomo Falcón National Park and which is distributed in a great part of the Falconian territory; the giant scolopendra, which is the largest centipede in the world, and the blue tarantula of Paraguaná (Chromatopelma cyaneopubescens) are also native.

In the cardonales and spines that occupy the lower areas, plants heavily armed with thorns predominate. Aloe vera and sisal crops are scattered throughout the region. In this environment, bats, savannah rabbits, common foxes, wild mice, iguanas and lizards stand out; and among the birds are the cardinal coriano and the paraulata llanera or chuchube (Mimus gilvus). It is also the endemic site of the Hueque scorpion (Tityus falconensis), a species of native scorpion whose distribution is excluded from the state of Falcon.

On the upper slopes of the mountains, cloud forests dominate where an enormous variety of ferns and palms grow. In the limestone formations of the Sierra you can find the guácharo, as well as interesting birds such as the blacksmith's bellbird and the emerald-billed toucan, and reptiles such as the nibbling turtle, a species endemic to the mountains of the Sistema Coriano.

Geology
Early Cretaceous rocks cover the pre-existing sedimentary units in the south, in what is one of the thickest sections in South America. The rounded hills of the Cocodite table are supported by an ancient igneous-metromorphic complex and a poorly-metamorphosed Jurassic succession.

To the east of Vela de Coro and Cumarebo, the foothills are supported by outcrops of the young Tertiary, also present to the north of Urumaco, where the stones are rough and darkened by iron oxide; while the plains concentrated in the lower part of the rivers are alluvial.

The arid plain presents quaternary earthquakes, with elevations sustained by rocks from the upper tertiary.

Politics and government
As a federal state, it is autonomous and equal in political terms to the other members of the Federation. It organizes its administration and public powers through the Federal Constitution of Falcón State of 2004, issued by the Legislative Council.

Executive power

It is composed of the Governor of the State of Falcón and a group of State Secretaries of his confidence appointed and removed by the regional government. The Governor is elected by the people through a direct and secret vote for a period of four years and with the possibility of immediate reelection for equal periods, being in charge of the state administration before the Legislative Council.

The first elected governor of Falcon was Aldo Cermeño of the Social Christian Party (Copei), who governed between 1989 and 1992. The current state governor is Victor Clark, of the ruling United Socialist Party of Venezuela (PSUV) party, elected for the 2017-2021 period.

Like the other 23 federal entities of Venezuela, the State maintains its own police force, which is supported and complemented by the National Police and the Venezuelan National Guard.

Legislative power

The state legislature is the responsibility of the Falcón State Legislative Council. It is a unicameral and autonomous body, elected by the people through direct and secret vote every four years, and maybe re-elected for two consecutive periods, under a system of proportional representation of the population of the state and its municipalities. It has 11 legislators, of whom 3 are list and 8 are nominal.

Municipalities and municipal seats 
Falcon State is subdivided into 25 municipalities (municipios), listed below with their administrative capitals, areas and populations.

The Paraguaná Peninsula comprises the municipalities of Carirubana,  and Falcón.

Demographics 

The population of Falcon State in 2011 was 902,847 inhabitants, while in 2001 there were 763,188 inhabitants. Its population density has risen from 30.8 inhabitants/km2 in 2001 to 36.4 inhabitants/km2 in 2011. Due to the constant growth of urban areas, a decrease in rural life is observed, with the urban population reaching 67.3% of the total state population in 1990. In 2011 it is estimated that the urban population will be around 600,000 inhabitants, distributed in several cities headed by the conurbation of 228,931 inhabitants formed by the city of Santa Ana de Coro (192,558 inhabitants) and its port La Vela de Coro (36,373 inhabitants); and by the metropolitan area of Punto Fijo, which includes the former fishing villages of Las Piedras, Carirubana and Punta Cardón, with a population of over 300,000 inhabitants. 

Other medium-sized cities structure their respective areas of influence, highlighting Puerto Cumarebo (22 047 inhabitants), Dabajuro (15 269 inhabitants), Tucacas (12 970 inhabitants), Churuguara (10 800 inhabitants) and Mene de Mauroa (10 302 inhabitants). Moreover, according to the last population census conducted by the National Institute of Statistics in 2011, 55.7% of the population is ethnically recognized as mestizo; 38.9% as Caucasian, concentrated mainly in the city of Punto Fijo; and 4.1% identified themselves as black.

Race and ethnicity 

According to the 2011 Census, the estimated racial composition of the population was:

Main population centers

Coro, the state capital, is the axis around which the political, cultural and social life of the region revolves. Founded on July 26, 1527. The first historical and religious capital of Venezuela. Declared a UNESCO World Heritage Site on December 9, 1993.
La Vela de Coro, the place where the national flag was first raised. Fishing, commercial and artisanal community. Along with Coro, World Heritage Site.
Mitare, a town in the west of the state, is a few kilometres from Coro. Its economy is based on the production of goats and shrimp fishing.
Puerto Cumarebo, capital of the municipality of Zamora Called La Perla de Falcon, is a fishing, commercial, tourist, agricultural and artisanal zone.
Punto Fijo, capital of the municipality Carirubana, located in the peninsula of Paraguaná. Commercial city, under the regime of Free Zone of Tourist Promotion and Investment since 1998, is the main economic, industrial, population and productive axis of Falcon.
Punta Cardón, located in the peninsula of Paraguaná. It has the "Gustavo Riera" Zoo, the only zoo in the state.
Santa Cruz de Los Taques, discovered in 1502 by Alonso de Ojeda, in this town is the bay of Amuay, a place of great scenic beauty.
Pueblo Nuevo, for many years was the largest population of the Paraguana Peninsula. Founded between 1730 and 1770, its economy is based on artisan activity, especially represented by excellent ceramists.
Adícora, primary holiday resort in the Paraguaná peninsula, located 60 km north of Coro.
Tocuyo de la Costa, a town located on the banks of the Tocuyo River in the municipality of Monseñor Iturriza.
Tocópero, a town whose economy derives from livestock and crafts, also has a cement industry that covers the entire state.
Tucacas, gateway to the state of Falcón on its eastern side. It is mainly a tourist and commercial town.
Chichiriviche, the main tourist center of the Venezuelan northwest. Located on the eastern coast of the state, it gives access to Morrocoy National Park.
Churuguara, capital of the municipality of Federación. The most important town in the Falcón mountain range, is mainly a tourist and agricultural town.
Dabajuro, has the largest commercial movement of the western Falcon. It is a collection center for the trade of agricultural and livestock products.
Mene de Mauroa, located 188 km west of Coro. Capital of the municipality of Mauroa, its economy is based on agricultural production.
Mirimire, the population of the east of the state. Its economy is based on the production of cattle, tobacco, corn and sugar cane.
Pedregal, capital of the municipality of Democracia. Cattle and artisan population of the Falconian west.
San Juan de Los Cayos, located 169 km southeast of Coro. Potential producer of fish, bananas, avocado, coconut and cattle.
Santa Cruz de Bucaral, capital of the Union municipality. It is one of the youngest towns in the Falcon Mountain Range.
Capatárida, capital of the municipality Buchivacoa, located west of Coro. It has a great historical and cultural tradition, economic activity based on goat breeding and fishing.

San Luis, a town located in the Sierra Falcon. It was initially inhabited by Jirajaras Indians.
Cabure, the old settlement of Jirajaras Indians. It was founded in 1769.
Curimagua, a valley in the Falcon Mountains. Cradle of the pre-independence movement led by the Zambo José Leonardo Chirino.
Borojó, a population of indigenous origin in the municipality of Buchivacoa located west of Falcon.

Economy

Economic resources
Its economic resources include;

Livestock: poultry, cattle, goats and pigs.
Fishing: Tuna, catfish, mackerel, corocoro and mullet (marine). Shrimp, crab and lobster, pepitonas and quigua (in) (mollusks).
Agricultural products: Sugar cane, coconut, corn, melon, yam, ocumo and sorghum.
Forest resources: Candlestick, cedar, cují, guamo, jabillo and vera.
Mineral resources: Sand, limestone, coal, chromite, gravel, oil and phosphate rocks.

Agriculture and cattle raising

The main economic activity in terms of employment is agriculture, with important crops such as coconut, onions, corn, tomatoes, patilla, melon, coffee, aloe and legumes.

The state of Falcón is the largest producer of coconut and copra, goats and goat products. It is the second largest in the production of fish, paprika and vegetables such as onions, and third in bovine milk and melon production. It also has great advantages for the production of dry floor vegetables such as melon, onions, sideburns and tomatoes. Coconuts alone represent approximately 20,000 hectares in cultivation, and there is availability to expand surface area on the eastern coast of Falcón State. Falcón State is one of the main producers of aloe vera in Venezuela, and the coffee, region has 3500 hectares in cultivation, but with a provision of 12 700 hectares, distributed in the Sierra de Coro in the south of the federal entity.

In the mountains coffee is cultivated, having prestige the productions in the Sierra de San Luis and Sierra de Churuguara.

On the Eastern Coast, there are important plantations of coconut trees, which have developed an important industry of oil extraction and use of copra. As for livestock, there is an abundance of goats, cattle and, to a lesser extent, pigs.

Economic activities
Falcon is the Venezuelan state with the most kilometres of coast, therefore the fishing activity has special dimensions. The annual production is 30,471 tons of fish and seafood, landed in the ports of Las Piedras, Puerto Cumarebo, Zazárida, Chichiriviche, and La Vela de Coro, highlighting the industrialization of crustaceans with the presence on the coast of the state of shrimp farms, as in Boca de Ricoa and at various points of the Paraguaná peninsula.

However, most oil industry activity is in the Paraguaná Refining Center, one of the largest in the world, made up of the Amuay Refining Complex and the Cardón Refinery, both with a capacity of 940,000 barrels of oil per day, which represents 75% of Venezuela's total refining capacity. These refineries are fed with crude oil and gas through products coming from the Maracaibo Lake basin. Likewise, a tourist investment free zone has been consolidated in the Paraguaná peninsula.

Falcón also has mineral deposits to generate basic inputs for industries such as ceramics, fertilizers, energy, chemicals, abrasives, metalworking, pharmaceuticals, pottery, and paint, among others. Phosphates are exploited in Riecito and limestone in Chichiriviche, which are processed at the Cumarebo cement plant (Holcim de Venezuela). It also has immense coal deposits in the western zone, with proven reserves for open-pit mining in the order of 20 million metric tons, and reserves estimated at 120 million metric tons, within a radius of action of 50,000 hectares. Other minerals in the area include graphite, silica, limestone, dolomite, phosphate, chromite and marble.

Thanks to the dry and arid climate, there are five natural salt flats and some 220,000 hectares of land suitable for the construction of artificial salt flats spread throughout the Falconian territory. Of all the salt mines, only the Las Cumaraguas salt mine is under industrial exploitation, the rest being exploited by hand.

Also, thanks to its natural landscapes (like the Medanos de Coro and the National Parks Cueva de la Quebrada del Toro, Sierra de San Luis and Morrocoy) tourism is gaining importance in the economy of the State.

Infrastructure

The region is mostly coastal lowlands and the northern Andean mountain hills, and is mostly dry with limited agriculture production. Farming mostly occurs in river valleys and mountainous areas, and includes maize, coconut, sesame, coffee and sugar cane.

Coro, the state capitol and the Paraguaná Peninsula have had significant amounts of industrialization and growth. Large oil refineries such as the Paraguana Refinery Complex in the city of Punto Fijo are located on the southwestern shore of the Paraguaná Peninsula, and approximately two-thirds of Venezuela's total oil production occurs in this area, much of which is exported via tanker ships that ship internationally through the port of Amuay.

Tourism

National parks and monuments

Los Médanos de Coro National Park: Desert landscape of singular beauty, located in the heart of the city of Coro. It has an area of 91 280 hectares.
Morrocoy National Park: Made up of keys and islets of coral origin, white sand, turquoise sea and dense mangrove forests. It has an area of 32 090 hectares.
National Park Cueva de la Quebrada del Toro: Located in the Falconian mountain range, it has an area of 4885 hectares.
Juan Crisóstomo Falcón National Park: It has a great variety of natural attractions. It has an extension of 20,000 hectares.
Cerro Santa Ana Natural Monument: Located in the center of Paraguaná. It has an area of 1900 hectares and an altitude of 850 meters above sea level. It was declared a Natural Monument on June 14, 1972.

Natural heritage
Thermal waters of Cardón and Cuiva
Guaibacoa Hot Springs
Boca de Aroa Beach
Adicora Beach
Cumarebo Port Beach
Tucacas Beaches
Beaches in Chichiriviche
Beaches of Morrocoy
Manaure Well
Tacarigua-Jatira Dam
Hueque Falls
Cuare Wildlife Refuge
The Indian's Cave (Cueva del Indio)
Haiton del Guarataro

Built heritage

Athenaeum of Coro
Cathedral Basilica Menor de Santa Ana 
Balcón de los Arcaya (Museum of Popular Pottery)
Balcón Bolívar (Museum of Contemporary Art)
House of 100 windows (Casa de las 100 ventanas)
Casa de las Ventanas de Hierro
Los Torres House
House of the Sun (Casa del Sol)
Treasury House (Casa del Tesoro)
Alberto Henriquez House Museum (Choir Synagogue)
Jewish cemetery in Coro
San Clemente's Cross
Church of San Nicolás de Bari
San Clemente Church
San Francisco Church
 Lucas Guillermo Castillo Diocesan Museum
Elias David Curiel School of Music
Hato Aguaque or Casa de Josefa Camejo
Taima Taima Archaeological and Paleontological Museum

Culture

Handicrafts
Falconian craftsmanship is rich in artistic expression. Within the popular handicrafts are the hammocks with unique styles, techniques and values of the state. The craft production is large and varied. The craftsmen of the towns that surround the city of Coro specialize in the manufacture of furniture with the wood of the cardon, the stick of Arch and the curarí. The wood is complemented using vegetable fibres such as sisal or with cow and goat skins. In Paraguaná the clay is worked to build objects for current domestic use, applying the same techniques used by the Caquetíos Indians. On the eastern coast, the attraction is the basketwork made with bulrush, cocuiza and vines and the hammocks made with thread.

Gastronomy
The typical Falconian food allows the enjoyment of a variety of flavors represented in its specialities, such as goat talkarí, goat milk cheese, custard, peeled arepa and goat milk candy. At a national level, rice with coconut and rice pudding is one of the most popular sweets, especially during the Easter season.

Folklore
Folkloric, traditional and religious expressions offer a seal of originality in the state. In typical celebrations, features of African, indigenous and European cultures are associated. Among these celebrations is the Baile de las Turas, which has its origin in an indigenous dance related to the hunting season and the harvesting of the corn crop. It is celebrated in San Pedro, El Tural and Mapararí in the mountain region, between 23 and 24 September. The drum dances in the cities of Coro, La Vela and Puerto Cumarebo are very joyful and colourful, and the celebration of the Day of the Mad (December 28) in La Vela de Coro, with masked parades in the streets and public squares, reaches a display similar to that of the great carnivals of the world.

Sports

 Unión Atlético Falcón (Second Division of Venezuela): a professional football club based in the city of Punto Fijo, Falcon State, Venezuela. It was founded in 2006, in the city of Santa Ana de Coro.
 Cachorros de Falcón (Bolivarian National Baseball League): It is one of the teams that has remained since the birth of the Bolivarian National Baseball League 15 years ago, which was champion of the Central Western Region on a couple of occasions, in 2012 by the hand of former professional baseball player Yony Naveda, and in 2016, under the helm of Roberto Chirinos, the latter, who is again in charge of the Westerners in 2019.

Sports facilities
Pedro Conde Stadium
José David Ugarte Stadium
Eduardo "Tata" Amaya Stadium
Carlos Sanchez Covered Gym
Fenelon Diaz Covered Gym
Ramon Pena Gilly Gym

See also 
 States of Venezuela
 List of Venezuela state legislatures

References

External links

 

 
States of Venezuela
States and territories established in 1864
1864 establishments in Venezuela